Malietoa Mōli [Semoanaifea] (“Lamp Oil” or “Illumination”) was a Samoan king who died in 1860.

Titular succession
Some speculate that both Mōlī and Malietoa Talavou Tonumaipe'a were both declared Malietoa following Malietoa Tinai "Natuitasina" Taimalelagi’s death; (Malietoa Vaiinupo had two sons, from his first marriage, the eldest died in a war, and his son lived under Malietoa Vaiinupo's shade, He had a family of his own and live like a normal person, a royal blood that was not recognized)   Mōlī married Fa‘alaitaua [Faaala], the daughter of Su‘apa‘ia from Sālelavalu, Savaii who also seems to have held the sa‘o‘aualuma title of Fuatino. This wife bore a son named Laupepa who later became Malietoa. Mōlī also seems to have fathered a son named Mōlī [or Moti] as well as a son named Faleono who is claimed to have been Mōlī’s eldest. Malietoa Mōlī was installed as Malietoa in 1858 or 1859 and probably received the Gato‘aitele and Tamasoāli‘i titles at that time. He had previously been named Tuiātua in 1841 and he held this distinction until his death. Unlike his uncle Taimalelagi and half-brother Talavou, Mōlī was a steadfast devotee of the London Missionary Society and consequently enjoyed the support of the increasingly powerful church.

Tenure as Malietoa
Mōlī’s short term as titleholder “was notable for his humiliation by foreign consuls” and Robert Louis Stevenson recounts several examples of the dishonor and embarrassment suffered at the hands of western politicians. He was “seized on several occasions by captains of warships of various nations as a hostage to secure the capture of Samoans who had offended European settlers”. The most famous of these incidents involved a highborn man from Sāgone, Savai‘i who in 1856 had murdered a European named William Fox in Sāla‘ilua, Savai‘i. Samoan justice was served when Sāla’ilua reciprocally took the life of a Sāgone noble, but “this was no settlement in European eyes” and a British gunship  pummeled the Sāgone coast with cannon fire. Mōlī was later punished with fines and “forced to assent to the execution” of the perpetrator. The judicial settlement of this incident took place in November 1858 while Taimalelagi lay dying and the bulk of administrative duties were already vested in Mōlī.

Death and titular transfer
When Mōlī’s own passing became inevitable, two contenders emerged as legitimate heirs to the Malietoa title, Mōlī’s younger brother Talavou (the Tupu o Sālafai) and Mōlī’s own son, Malietoa Laupepa. Malietoa Mōlī – the Tuiātua, Gato‘aitele and Tamasoāli‘i – died in 1860 and was buried in a grand tomb at Malie after holding the Malietoa title for less than two years. Mōlī’s descendants, including Head of State Malietoa Tanumafili II, form the modern Sā Mōlī branch of the Sā Malietoa descent line.

See also
Bombardment of Upolu   
United States Exploring Expedition

References

Malietoa
1790 births
1860 deaths
1850s in Samoa
1860s in Samoa